The Pensioners' Party is a political party in Norway without parliamentary representation. It was founded in 1985 to work for the interests of pensioners, and the party mainly focuses on issues related to health care, taxes and pensioners' issues.

The party has never been elected to parliament, although former MP Arne Haukvik, who was elected on the Centre Party (Sp) list in 1993, joined the party prior to the 1997 election after he was not renominated by the Sp. The party has representatives in the local councils of some cities and county assemblies.

Electoral results

References

 
Political parties in Norway
Pensioners' parties
Political parties established in 1985
1985 establishments in Norway